Ceroxys amurensis is a species of ulidiid or picture-winged fly in the genus Ceroxys of the family Tephritidae.

Distribution
Russia, China.

References

amurensis
Insects described in 1939
Diptera of Asia
Taxa named by Willi Hennig